General Gardiner may refer to:

Lou Gardiner (1952–2015), New Zealand Army major general
Lynedoch Gardiner (1820–1897), British Army general
Robert Gardiner (British Army officer) (1781–1864), British Army general
William Gardiner (British Army officer) (1748–1806), British Army lieutenant general

See also
General Gardner (disambiguation)